Robert Wilhelm Ekman (August 13, 1808 – February 19, 1873),  R. W. Ekman, was a significant teacher and painter of the Finnish romantic portraits and early national romanticism.

Childhood and Arts Education
Robert Ekman was born in Uusikaupunki, Finland to an upper-class family. Both of his parents died when he was approximately 10 years old. They left behind five orphans who were placed in foster homes. Their schooling was incomplete and there was no chance of higher academic education.

Robert Ekman first studied art under the guidance of Finnish painter Gustaf Wilhelm Finnberg (1784–1833), but in 1824 together with his brother Fredric, Joachim begun studies at the Royal Swedish Academy of Arts in Stockholm and later studied in the studio of Johan Gustaf Sandberg (1782–1854). Already as a student Ekman specialized in portraying the life of the common people, instead of Classicism of the academic arts. Ekman graduated in 1836, and was granted a generous traveling scholarship for excelling in his studies. This supported him working in the Netherlands, France and Italy between years 1837–1844. As the scholarship was not plausible otherwise, Ekman took Swedish citizenship.

Court Painter and a Teacher
Upon returning to Stockholm, Ekman was dubbed as an agré (member candidate) and was accepted as a member of the academy in 1844. The title included the one of royal court and history painter. In 1845 Ekman returned to Turku, where he began decorating the Turku Cathedral with wall paintings. The laborious fresco were finished in 1854. Additionally, he completed over 30 church altarpieces during his career including works at Helsinki (1846–1848), Sääksmäki (1847), Viitasaari (1849), Sauvon (1853), Oulu (1859), Tammela (1860), Vaasa (1861), Pori (1863), Paimio (1865), Tyrvää (1866) and Perelt (1871).

Having lived in Finland for ten years, Ekman regained Finnish citizenship in 1855. Having moved to Turku, Ekman started working on art education with master painter  (1800–1862). He died at Turku during 1873.

Works
{{gallery
|mode=packed
|height=120
|Robert Wilhelm Ekman - Great Fire of Turku.jpg|Great Fire of Turku
|Mathilda Rotkirch by Ekman.jpg|Portrait of Mathilda Rotkirch, 1848
|Robert Wilhelm Ekman - Pentti Lyytinen Recites Poems in a Cottage in Savo.jpg| Recites Poems in a Cottage in Savo
|R. W. Ekman Vänrikki Stool.jpg|Ensign Stål and the Undergraduate, 1853
|Mikael Agricola luovuttaa Uuden testamentin suomennoksen kuningas Kustaa Vaasalle.jpg|Mikael Agricola Hands Over the Finnish Translation of the New Testament to King Gustav Wasa, 1853
|Georg August Wallin by Robert Wilhelm Ekman - Arppeanum - DSC05234.JPG|Portrait of Georg August Wallin, 1853
|St Henrik dop Kuppis R.W. Ekman.jpg|Bishop Henry Baptizing Finns, 1850–54
|Robert Wilhelm Ekman - Kohtaus Hirvenhiihtäjistä - A I 45 - Finnish National Gallery.jpg|Scene from J. L. Runeberg´s "Moose Hunters", 1856
|Robert Wilhelm Ekman - Ilmatar - A II 1256 - Finnish National Gallery.jpg|Ilmatar, 1860
|Robert Wilhelm Ekman - Fleeing Paganism; Väinämöinen Gives Way to the Power of the Cross.jpg|Fleeing Paganism; Väinämöinen Gives Way to the Power of the Cross, 1860
|Robert Wilhelm Ekman - Italian Man with a Child.jpg|Italian Man with a Child, 1860
|Robert Wilhelm Ekman - Jesus Wakes Lazarus - A I 48 - Finnish National Gallery.jpg|Jesus Wakes Lazarus, 1860
|Robert Wilhelm Ekman - Väinämöinen and Maiden of Pohjola.jpg|Väinämöinen and Maiden of Pohjola, 1861
|Lemminkäisen äiti Tuonelassa.jpg|Lemminkäinen's Mother at Tuonela, 1862
|Valtiopäivät 1863.jpg|Emperor Alexander II Declares the 1863 Diet Session Open, 1865
|Robert Wilhelm Ekman - Bridal Sauna.jpg|Bridal Sauna|Robert Wilhelm Ekman - Väinämöinen’s Play.jpg|Väinämöinen's Play, 1866, a 4-meter tall painting displayed at Old Student House, Helsinki
|Robert Wilhelm Ekman - Lemminkäinen at the Fiery Lake.jpg|Lemminkäinen at the Fiery Lake, c. 1867, depicting a call for help from Ukko
|Robert Wilhelm Ekman - Kreeta Haapasalo Playing the Kantele in a Peasant Cottage.jpg|Kreeta Haapasalo Playing the Kantele in a Peasant Cottage, 1868
|Robert Wilhelm Ekman - Mary Magdalene by the Grave of Christ.jpg|Mary Magdalene by the Grave of Christ, 1869
|Robert Wilhelm Ekman - Winter Fishing in Front of Turku - A II 966 - Finnish National Gallery.jpg|Winter Fishing in front of Turku, 1872
}}

See also
Finnish art

References

Other sources
Hintze, Bertel (1926) Robert Wilhelm Ekman 1808–1873: En konsthistorisk studie'' (Helsingfors: Schildt)

1808 births
1873 deaths
People from Uusikaupunki
Romantic painters
History painters
Fresco painters
19th-century Finnish painters
Finnish male painters
Finnish emigrants to Sweden
Naturalized citizens of Finland
Naturalized citizens of Sweden
Swedish expatriates in Finland
Swedish expatriates in France
Swedish expatriates in Italy
Swedish expatriates in the Netherlands
Swedish people of Finnish descent
19th-century Finnish male artists